is a former Japanese football player who mostly played for Ventforet Kofu. 

His older brother Shota is also a professional football player.

Club statistics
Updated to 23 February 2020.

References

External links
Profile at Ventforet Kofu

1985 births
Living people
Waseda University alumni
Association football people from Nagasaki Prefecture
Japanese footballers
J1 League players
J2 League players
Oita Trinita players
Ventforet Kofu players
Association football defenders